Alexander de Tartagnis ( 1424 – 1477) was an Italian jurist.

After completing his studies in Bologna, he became an assessor at the Conservatore della Giustizia and taught law in Bologna, Ferrara and Padua.

His work includes commentaries on select parts of the Pandects and on other works, as well as more than 1200 advisory opinions. He reports that, for humanitarian reasons, he did not issue advisory opinions in the disfavour of the accused in criminal cases.

Paulus Castrensis was one of his teachers. Jason de Mayno, Bartholomaeus Socinus, and Ludovico Bolognini were three of his students.

Works

References

1420s births
1477 deaths
Year of birth uncertain
15th-century Italian jurists
University of Bologna alumni
Academic staff of the University of Bologna
Academic staff of the University of Ferrara
Academic staff of the University of Padua